"Speechless" is a song recorded by American DJ and music producer Candyland. It features Los Angeles based musical duo RKCB.

Release
"Speechless" was released as the fourth single by Candyland, as a solo act on 13 October 2015, exclusively through Spotify. The song was later released for all platforms on 30 October.

The song's cover art was originally designed by Indonesian illustrator Yuschav Arly.

Music video
On 30 October, the official audio for "Speechless" was uploaded onto Mr. Suicide Sheep's YouTube channel.  the video has over 2 million views.

Track listing

Charts

References

2015 songs
2015 singles
Candyland (musician) songs